The Chevrolet Trailblazer is an automobile nameplate used by General Motors for its Chevrolet brand since 1999 for several SUV models:

 TrailBlazer, a name of appearance package for the Chevrolet S-10 Blazer used between 1999 and 2002
 Chevrolet Trailblazer, a mid-size SUV produced since 2001 as the successor to the S-10 Blazer
 Chevrolet Trailblazer, a subcompact crossover produced since 2020

See also 
 Chevrolet Blazer

Trailblazer
Cars introduced in 2001